Henry Brinsley Sheridan (1820 – 19 April 1906) was an English Liberal Party politician who sat in the House of Commons between 1857 and 1886, representing Dudley. He was also a Fellow of the Royal Geographical Society, a magistrate, and a captain of the 6th Cinque Port Artillery Volunteer Corps.

Life
Sheridan was the son of Garrett Sheridan of Cavan, Ireland and his wife Jane Juliana Darnley, daughter of Sir Richard Perrot, Bart. He was born in London in 1820 and was educated at Brighton. He entered the Inner Temple on 18 February 1852 and was called to the bar at the Inner Temple in 1856. He was a captain of the 6th Cinque Port Artillery Volunteer Corps and a J.P. for Middlesex, Westminster, Kent, and the Liberties of the Cinque Ports.

Sheridan wrote a poem entitled St. Lawrence's Well which was published in 1845.

Sheridan married Elizabeth Frances Wood, eldest surviving daughter of the Rev. John Wood on 10 December 1850. The marriage took place at Walworth. Sheridan was stated to be living at Brompton at this time.

In 1855, Sheridan moved into Belfield House in Fulham, residing there until 1863.

Sheridan was elected as the Member of Parliament (MP) for Dudley in 1857 after the sitting MP, Stafford Northcote, decided not to contest the general election of that year. Northcote had fallen out politically with Lord Ward, the owner of Dudley Castle and influential local landowner.  Sheridan was unopposed at the election as both Radical and Tory factions in the town combined to support him in order to lessen the local political influence of Lord Ward. He subsequently won contested elections in 1859 and 1865.  In 1868 he was elected unopposed. At the general election in February 1874, Sheridan won but the election was declared void on 28 April 1874 on the grounds that rioting took place at the poll. At the subsequent by-election held on 21 May 1874, he was again returned, defeating the ironmaster, Noah Hingley. He won the seat again in 1880 and 1885. He finally lost the seat in 1886, beaten at the election by Brooke Robinson.

Around the time that his parliamentary career was coming to an end, it was reported that he had expended the sum of £24,000 in order to "consolidate the Liberal interests of the town". 
 
Sheridan was elected as a Fellow of the Royal Geographical Society of London in June 1860.  He was on the council of the Kent Archaeological Society. He owned property at Litton Cheney in Dorset.

In the 1860s, Sheridan became involved in lending money to the government of Mexico, becoming chairman of the Mexican Bondholders' Committee.

In 1861, he was made a First Lieutenant of the 6th Cinque Ports Artillery Volunteers.

In 1869, Sheridan was listed as being part of the Chapter of the Venerable English Langue of the Sovereign and Illustrious Order Of St John Of Jerusalem.

In 1880, he was listed as living at 6 Colville Gardens, Kensington.

Henry Brinsley Sheridan died on 19 April 1906 aged 86.

Parliamentary election results

References

External links 
 

1820 births
1906 deaths
Independent members of the House of Commons of the United Kingdom
Liberal Party (UK) MPs for English constituencies
UK MPs 1857–1859
UK MPs 1859–1865
UK MPs 1865–1868
UK MPs 1868–1874
UK MPs 1874–1880
UK MPs 1880–1885
UK MPs 1885–1886
Members of the Inner Temple